Carnegie Hall Concert is the third recording released by the Toshiko Akiyoshi Jazz Orchestra featuring Lew Tabackin.  The album received a 1992 Grammy award nomination in the category "Best Large Jazz Ensemble Performance."

Track listing
All arrangements by Akiyoshi.  All songs composed by Akiyoshi except as noted:
(spoken introductions of band members) – 0:54
 "Children of the Universe" – 16:42
 "I Know Who Loves You" – 8:19
 "After Mr. Teng" – 9:33
 "Your Beauty is a Song of Love" (Wess) – 6:41
 "Kourakan Suite" – 21:00
 Part 1: "Kourakan"
 Part 2: "Prayer"
 "Chasing After Love" – 9:22
 "How Do You Get To Carnegie Hall?" – 4:09

Personnel
Toshiko Akiyoshi – piano
Lew Tabackin – tenor saxophone, flute
Frank Wess – alto saxophone, flute
Jim Snidero – alto saxophone, soprano saxophone, flute, clarinet, piccolo
Walt Weiskopf  – tenor saxophone, soprano saxophone, flute, clarinet,
Scott Robinson – baritone saxophone, bass clarinet
Freddie Hubbard – trumpet
Mike Ponella – trumpet
John Eckert – trumpet
Greg Gisbert – trumpet
Joe Magnarelli – trumpet
Herb Besson – trombone
Conrad Herwig – trombone
Larry Ferrel – trombone
Matt Finders – bass trombone
Peter Washington – bass
Terry Clarke – drums

Guest 
Nnenna Freelon – Vocal (Kourakan Suite Part 2, "Prayer")

References / External Links
Columbia  CK-48805
[ Allmusic]
1992 Grammy nomination, Best Large Jazz Ensemble Performance (LA Times link)

Toshiko Akiyoshi – Lew Tabackin Big Band albums
1992 live albums
Albums recorded at Carnegie Hall